Srinivasa Iyer Ramaswamy, better known as Cho Ramaswamy (5 October 1934    – 7 December 2016), was an Indian actor, comedian, character actor, editor, political satirist, playwright, film director and lawyer from Tamil Nadu. He was a popular comedian in the 1960s and 70s, and had acted with all the top stars in that period.

Early life 
Srinivasa Iyer Ramaswamy was fondly addressed and remembered as Cho. Born in a Brahmin family of lawyers

Family 
The elder son of R. Srinivasa Iyer and Rajammal, Cho had a younger brother, who was also an actor. Cho died on 7 December 2016.
He has two children Sriram Ramaswamy and Sindhuja. He did his schooling from P. S. High School. His niece is actress Ramya Krishnan. The name 'Cho' was the name of the character he played in a Tamil play written by Bhageerathan titled Thenmozhiyaal.

Film career

Films 
Cho made his debut in 1963 with Paar Magale Paar as a comedian. From 1963 to 2005 he acted in 180 Tamil films and directed 5 films. He also wrote and directed 20 plays.

He also wrote and acted in 27 Television serials. He wrote 10 books. Apart from being an actor, he was both the screenplay and story writer of films such as Thenmazhai, Ninaivil Nindraval, Bommalattam, Aayiram Poi and Panam Paththum Seyyum, all of which proved to be box office hits.

Cho played the role of a bike mechanic in the play Petralthan Pillaiya, written by Pattu of the United Amateur Artistes (UAA), which became a huge success. When the play was later adapted into a film by director A. Bhimsingh, Sivaji Ganesan persuaded Cho to play the same role in the film too, leading to Cho's entry into the film world. Cho and Jayalalithaa have worked together in 19 films and also had been part of the same drama troupe.

Frequent collaborations 

Cho as an actor has been pitted against other actors across generations. His comic timing against T. S. Balaiah in Manam Oru Kurangu, or with M. R. Radha, or many times with actors like V. K. Ramaswamy, Nagesh, Manorama and Sachu in many films brought out the best in him.

Cho and Manorama were paired together in 20 films, which included Malligaip poo, Annaiyum pithavum, Dharisanam, Anbait thedi, Ninaivil Nindraval, Nirai Kudam, Therottam, Aayiram Poi, Mohammed Bin Tughlaq, Bommalattam, Pugundha Veedu, Vilayaattu Pillai, Kanavan, Rojavin Raja and Velum Mayilum Thunai and were pitted in a non-couple role in Suryagandhi, Delhi Mappilai and Naadagame Ulagam.

Cho acted alongside Nagesh in Thenmazhai, Ninaivil Nindraval, Ulagam Ivvalavudhaan and Bommalattam among others. He was paired opposite Sachu in films like Deva Sankalpam, Galaataa Kalyanam and Delhi Mappilai.

Cho has acted with the MGR–Jayalalitha combo in films like Oli Villaku, Kanavan, Kumarikottam, Mattukara Velan, Aadimai Penn, Engal Thangam, Thedi Vantha Mapillai, En Annan and Neerum Nerupum. Cho has acted with MGR in many films like Petralthaan Pillaiya, Sangey Muzhangu, Rickshawkaaran and Thalaivan. Cho has acted with Jayalalitha in other films like Bommalaattam, Galaattaak kalyanam, Suryagandhi, Vandhaale Maharaasi and Anbai Thedi.

Cho has acted with Sivakumar in films like Shanmugapriya, Onne Onnu Kanne Kannu, Thaip Paasam, Uravu Solla Oruvan, Aan Pillai Singam, Yaarukkum Vetkamillai, Chinna Kuyil Padudhu, Sattai Illatha Pambaram and Kanna Thorakiran Samy. Among these, Yaarukkum Vetkamillai was directed by Cho in 1976.

Journalism 
He was the founder and editor of the Tamil magazine Thuglak.
Politicians such as J. B. Kripalani, Indira Gandhi, Karunanidhi, Chandra Shekhar, G. K. Moopanar, M. G. Ramachandran, Jayalalithaa, Ramakrishna Hegde, N. T. Rama Rao, Atal Bihari Vajpayee, and L. K. Advani, Sonia Gandhi, Manmohan Singh and P. Chidambaram were targets of his editorial attacks. In his last years, he predicted that Narendra Modi would "win laurels for India" in the future, and also praised Jayalalithaa for her administration of Tamil Nadu.

Cho enjoyed challenging MG Ramachandran (MGR) and his politics, while Karunanidhi stayed his target. The All India Anna Dravida Munnetra Kazhagam (AIADMK), in his opinion, was populist and lacked ideology. When Jayalalithaa got into power and followed in MGR's path, however, the absence of ideology of the party was no longer an issue for him. 

On 25 January 2017, the Government of India announced a posthumous Padma Bhushan award for his contribution towards Literature & Education – Journalism.

Politics 
Cho has been described as a right-wing public intellectual in tributes.

Cho was publicly opposed to Sri Lankan Tamil militants, particularly the Liberation Tigers of Tamil Eelam (LTTE), at a time when Sri lanka's ethnic crisis was at its peak and almost all political parties in Tamil Nadu highlighted the issue of the Sri Lankan Tamils.

The rise of the BJP and Hindutva forces made Cho as their sympathiser. He started involving in direct politics as mediator. In 1999, he was instrumental in bringing the DMK together in an alliance with the Bharatiya Janata Party. He was successful in bringing G.K. Moopanar (Tamil Manila Congress) and Karunanidhi together in the 1996 elections, and getting Rajnikanth to publicly support the alliance to defeat Jayalalithaa. Post 2004, he became soft towards Jayalalithaa and spent all his energy in opposing the DMK and promoting the Bharatiya Janata Party Later on, in 2011 he convinced DMDK Vijayakanth to partner with the AIADMK. Cho was an ardent supporter of Narendra Modi. Cho had campaigned for Prime Minister Narendra Modi during 2014 Indian general election. Modi described Ramaswamy as "Rajguru", and called himself his "fan".  

He was nominated to the Rajya Sabha by the President of India, K. R. Narayanan. In the Rajya Sabha 12 MPs are nominated by the President of India from amongst persons who have special knowledge or practical experience in the fields of literature, science, art or social service. He served as a Rajya Sabha MP from November 1999 to November 2005.

He remained the Sangh Parivar's political man in Chennai.

Partial filmography

As actor

Direction 
 Muhammad bin Tughluq
 Unmaiye Un Vilai Enna
 Mr. Sampath
 Yarukkum Vetkam Illai
 Sambo Siva Samboo

Screenplay 
 Neelagiri Express
 Aayiram Poi
 Nirai Kudam
 Bommalattam
 Ninaivil Nindraval

Other works

Plays

Bibliography 
 Hindu Maha Samudram Vol – I, II, III, IV, V, and VI (Latest)
 Mahabaratham Pesugirathu
 Valmiki Ramayanam
 Verukathagada Bramaniyam
 Nane Raja

Television 
 Engey Brahmanan?
 Verukatthakkatha Brahmaneeyam?
 Sambavami Yuge Yuge
 Vande Mataram
 Ivargalai Therindhu Kollungal
 Washington Il Nallathambi
 Sarakar Pugunda Veedu
 Koovam Nadikaraiyinile
 Adhigaprasangam
 Yaro Ivar Yaro?
 Saadhal Ellaiyel Kaadhal
 Mydear BrahmaDeva
 India Enge Pogiradhu?
 Kamarajarai Sandhitthen
 Puratchi Geethai
 Sattam Thalai Guniyattum
 Enge Pogirai?
 Embak Kana Onru Kandaen
 Saraswathiyin Selvan
 Manam Oru Kurangu
 En Koodathu?
 Eravil Chennai
 Uravugal Ellaiyadi Pappa
 Edarkaga?
 Thiraiyulagathai Thirumbi Parkiraen
 Unmayae Unn Villai Ennae?
 Janatha Nagar Colony

Satire 
Following Sanjay Gandhi's death in an air crash, Cho released stamps in memory of Capt. Subhash Saxena, the pilot of the aircraft, who also died in the air crash. The postal departments failed to realise that these stamps were not official and mistakenly delivered mail that had them affixed.

Illness and death 
Cho was hospitalized in January 2015 and was in and out of hospital due to illness. He died of a cardiac arrest at 3:58 AM on 7 December 2016, aged 82, at Apollo Hospital in Chennai, where he was receiving treatment for respiratory problems. He was survived by his wife, Soundaramba Ramaswamy, son Rajivakshan alias Sriram, and daughter Sindhu.

His death happened a day after Jayalalithaa had died. Rajinikanth disclosed later that Jayalalithaa had always wished that Cho should live as long as she lived. He quoted: "As it turns out, he was alive till then and even few hours after that."

K. Veeramani, leader of the Dravidar Kazhagam and a self-confessed atheist, in his tributes to Cho, said he was a unique journalist with independent views.

References

External links 

 Audio of Cho Ramaswamy on Mrs Pratibha Patil, prior to the Indian Presidential elections where Mrs Patil was a candidate (in Tamil), 13 July 2007.
 Profile, thehindu.com, 2 June 2004.
 Profile, TribuneIndia.com, 11 July 2004.
 Profile, Rediff.com; accessed 28 January 2018.
 Virtual Page, HarmonyIndia.org; accessed 28 January 2018.
 Profile, tribuneindia.com; accessed 28 January 2018.
 PM Visit, indianexpress.com; accessed 28 January 2018.
 CM Visit, thehindu.com; accessed 28 January 2018.
 Obituary, indiatimes.com; accessed 28 January 2018.

1934 births
2016 deaths
Tamil comedians
Tamil Nadu politicians
Tamil dramatists and playwrights
Indian theatre directors
Indian male stage actors
Indian male journalists
Nominated members of the Rajya Sabha
Indian male comedians
Indian male dramatists and playwrights
20th-century Indian male actors
20th-century Indian dramatists and playwrights
Male actors from Chennai
Indian satirists
Tamil screenwriters
Tamil film directors
Recipients of the Padma Bhushan in literature & education
Screenwriters from Chennai
20th-century Indian male writers
Tamil television writers